The 2018–19 Kent State Golden Flashes men's basketball team represented Kent State University during the 2018–19 NCAA Division I men's basketball season. The Golden Flashes, led by eighth-year head coach Rob Senderoff, played their home games at the Memorial Athletic and Convocation Center, also known as the MAC Center, as members of the East Division of the Mid-American Conference. They finished the season 22–11, 11–7 in MAC play to finish in third place in the East Division. They lost in the quarterfinals of the MAC tournament to Central Michigan. They were invited to the CollegeInsider.com Tournament where they lost in the first round to Louisiana–Monroe.

Previous season
In the 2017–18 season, the Golden Flashes finished the season 17–17, 9–9 in MAC play to finish in second place in the MAC East division. They defeated Northern Illinois and Ball State in the MAC tournament before losing to Buffalo in the semifinals.

Roster

Schedule and results
The 2018–19 schedule was released on August 1, 2018.

|-
!colspan=9 style=| Exhibition

|-
!colspan=9 style=|Non-conference regular season

|-
!colspan=9 style=| MAC regular season

|-
!colspan=9 style=| MAC tournament

|-
!colspan=9 style=| CollegeInsider.com Postseason tournament

See also
 2018–19 Kent State Golden Flashes women's basketball team

References

Kent State
Kent State Golden Flashes men's basketball seasons
Kent State
Kent State
Kent State